The Detroit mayoral special election of 2009 took place on May 5, 2009. It was a special election to fill the remainder of the term of Kwame Kilpatrick  who had resigned as mayor.

This special election was mandated by Detroit's City Charter in order to determine who will serve out the remaining months in the term of former mayor Kwame Kilpatrick, who resigned in September 2008.

Incumbent mayor Kenneth Cockrel Jr., who was previously president of the Detroit City Council, had become acting mayor upon Kilpatrick's resignation.

Candidates
Incumbent mayor Kenneth Cockrel Jr., who as president of the Detroit City Council became acting mayor upon Kilpatrick's resignation, was seeking reelection. Other candidates included Dave Bing, a community leader and former NBA professional basketball player for the Detroit Pistons, Freman Hendrix, former deputy mayor and a mayoral candidate in 2005, Wayne County Sheriff Warren Evans, and others.

Results

Primary
Dave Bing and incumbent mayor Kenneth Cockrel Jr. won the top two spots in the special primary on February 24 and proceeded to contest the special general election on May 5.

General election
Bing won this election with 52% of the vote and was sworn in as mayor on May 11.

References

Detroit
Detroit
2009
Detroit
Detroit 2009
Detroit
mayoral special election